Reinhard Schwarzenberger (born 7 January 1977) is an Austrian former ski jumper.

Career
He won a bronze medal in the team large hill at the 1998 Winter Olympics of Nagano. Schwarzenberger also won a bronze medal in the team large hill at the 1999 FIS Nordic World Ski Championships in Ramsau.

World Cup

Standings

Wins

External links
 
 
  

1977 births
Living people
Austrian male ski jumpers
Olympic ski jumpers of Austria
Olympic bronze medalists for Austria
Ski jumpers at the 1998 Winter Olympics
Olympic medalists in ski jumping
FIS Nordic World Ski Championships medalists in ski jumping
Medalists at the 1998 Winter Olympics
Universiade medalists in ski jumping
People from Zell am See District
Universiade silver medalists for Austria
Competitors at the 2003 Winter Universiade
Competitors at the 2005 Winter Universiade
Sportspeople from Salzburg (state)
20th-century Austrian people
21st-century Austrian people